Polar Capital is a large British investment trust dedicated to investing in a portfolio of technology companies around the World. Established in December 1996, the company is a constituent of the FTSE 250 Index. The chair is Sarah Bates.

References

External links
 Official site

Investment trusts of the United Kingdom